Ryan Griffin may refer to:

 Ryan Griffin (tight end) (born 1990), American football tight end for the Chicago Bears
 Ryan Griffin (quarterback) (born 1989), American football quarterback for the Tampa Bay Buccaneers

See also
Ryan Griffen, Australian footballer